State Trunk Highway 128 (often called Highway 128, STH-128 or WIS 128) is a  state highway in Pierce and St. Croix counties in Wisconsin, United States. It runs in north–south in northwest Wisconsin from near Elmwood to Forest.

Route description
The highway begins at an intersection with WIS 72 and runs north from it, following the Eau Galle River until its intersection with County Trunk Highway B (CTH-B), from which it continues north. It passes through intersections with WIS 29 and CTH-N and an interchange with Interstate 94 (I-94) before intersecting with US Highway 12 (US 12) near Hersey and Wilson. It then continues north before curving eastward to meet WIS 170 in Glenwood City. From there it runs north until it terminates at WIS 64.

History
Initially, in 1923, WIS 128 was established roughly along part of its present-day route and present-day CTH-B from WIS 51 (now WIS 72) in Elmwood to WIS 116 (now WIS 29) in Spring Valley. Then, in 1934, WIS 128 extended northward to WIS 79 in Glenwood, superseding CTH-A in the process. In 1947, WIS 79 moved off from Glenwood and instead served Connorsville. As a result, WIS 170 extended westward towards Glenwood while WIS 128 extended northward towards WIS 64. By 1994, WIS 128 moved eastward onto the existing bypass of Spring Valley, superseding CTH-T. As a result, CTH-B was established to follow along part of the former alignment.

Major intersections

See also

References

External links

128
Transportation in Pierce County, Wisconsin
Transportation in St. Croix County, Wisconsin